Lo Zuccone, which translates from Italian as "large head" or "bald head", is the popular name given to a marble statue by Donatello. It was commissioned for the bell tower of the Cathedral of Florence, Italy and completed between 1423 and 1425. It is also known as the Statue of the Prophet Habakkuk, as many believe it depicts the Biblical figure Habakkuk, though Vasari says that it is a portrait (in Biblical garb) of Giovanni di Barduccio Cherichini.

The statue is known for its realism and naturalism, which differed from most statuary commissioned at the time. Zuccone is reported to have been Donatello's favorite, and he has been claimed to swear by the sculpture, "By the faith I place in my zuccone." Donatello is said to have shouted "speak, damn you, speak!" at the marble as he was carving it. It has been described as the most important marble sculpture of the fifteenth century. It is now in the Museo dell'Opera del Duomo in Florence.

References

External links
Florence Cathedral site (English)

Sculptures in Italy
Sculptures by Donatello
Renaissance art
Sculptures depicting Hebrew Bible prophets
Book of Habakkuk
Sculptures of men in Italy